A metretes was an ancient Greek unit of liquid measurement, equivalent to 39.3 liters.

See also
Ancient Greek units of measurement

Obsolete units of measurement
Units of volume